Martin Foster (born 29 October 1977) is an English former footballer who used to play as a midfielder. He is now assistant-manager with Gainsborough Trinity of the National League North.

Career 

Born in Rotherham, South Yorkshire, Foster started his career with Leeds United but did not make any senior appearances for the club. He moved to Scottish football to sign for Greenock Morton having had experience in a loan spell with Blackpool during his time at Elland Road.

After a short period in Scotland, Foster returned to English football with Doncaster Rovers where his opportunities were limited, though he had a spell with Ilkeston Town on loan. In 2001, he signed for Forest Green Rovers in the Conference National. He made well over 100 appearances for the club and had a spell as captain. He also appeared for Forest Green in the 2001 FA Trophy final at Villa Park but was on the losing side in a 1–0 defeat to Canvey Island. He was highly regarded amongst the supporters at The Lawn and many were sad to see him leave when he departed for Halifax Town in 2004. He made just under 100 league appearances for Halifax at The Shay before a move in 2007 to Oxford United.

Foster only had a short spell at the Kassam Stadium with Oxford in the Conference National before moving to fellow Conference club Rushden & Diamonds. After a short period with Rushden at Nene Park he departed to drop down into the Conference North to play for Tamworth. In January 2008 he signed an 18-month contract with the Staffordshire-based club.

In June 2009, Foster became the fourth player to sign for Conference North new boys Eastwood Town. A lack of games for the Coronation Park side, however, saw Foster make the move to Conference North rivals Harrogate Town on 10 December 2009. Foster made his debut for Town in a 3–1 win over Hinckley United on 19 January 2010.

References

External links 

 
 

1977 births
Living people
English footballers
Association football midfielders
Leeds United F.C. players
Blackpool F.C. players
Greenock Morton F.C. players
Doncaster Rovers F.C. players
Ilkeston Town F.C. (1945) players
Forest Green Rovers F.C. players
Halifax Town A.F.C. players
Oxford United F.C. players
Rushden & Diamonds F.C. players
Tamworth F.C. players
Eastwood Town F.C. players
Harrogate Town A.F.C. players
Hull United A.F.C. players
English Football League players
Footballers from Rotherham
Matlock Town F.C. managers
English football managers